The 2015 Ulster Senior Club Football Championship was the 48th instalment of the annual Ulster Senior Club Football Championship organised by Ulster GAA. It was one of the four provincial competitions of the 2015–16 All-Ireland Senior Club Football Championship.

Slaughtneil from Derry entered the championship as defending champions. Monaghan champions Scotstown ended their reign at the quarter-final stage.

Armagh kingpins Crossmaglen Rangers secured their 11th Ulster club title after beating Scotstown in the final.

Teams
The Ulster championship is contested by the winners of the nine county championships in the Irish province of Ulster. Ulster comprises the six counties of Northern Ireland, as well as Cavan, Donegal and Monaghan in the Republic of Ireland.

2015 Ulster Senior Club Football Championship

Preliminary round

Quarter-finals

Semi-finals

Final

Championship statistics

Top scorers
Overall

In a single game

References

2U
Ulster Senior Club Football Championship
2015 in Northern Ireland sport